Reflex locomotion, usually referred to as the Vojta method, is a technique for the treatment of physical and mental impairment in humans. It was discovered by Václav Vojta.

Based on studies of treatments for spastic children for muscular disorders in the 1950s, a number of reflex points were identified which can be used to stimulate the human body to crawl and turn. By applying pressure to the appropriate reflex points the major muscle groups in the body are activated, breathing becomes regulated and mental activity increases.

The Vojta method is classified as alternative medicine.
As of 1981—1986 the clinical trials could not show the clinical effect of Vojta and Bobath treatments.

References

External links
 International Vojta Society

Medical treatments